Paula Prendes Martínez (Gijón, Asturias, January 21, 1983) is a Spanish actress, television presenter and journalist.

Biography 
He attended her first studies at the Cabueñes Public School. Later she went on to study at the IES El Piles, also in her hometown, Gijón.

With a degree in Audiovisual Communication from the Universidad Pontificia de Salamanca, Paula Prendes has been an editor and news anchor at SER Gijón, sports at SER Salamanca, news at Localia de Madrid and has been a reporter at El octavo mandamiento, an entertainment program directed by Javier Cárdenas at Localia de Madrid. She has also presented Electronic Arts, a program broadcast on a well-known videogame website and has collaborated as a reporter on MTV.

In television, she has starred in the series Somos cómplices (Antena 3) and Becarios (Telecinco) and has participated in others such as Bicho malo (nunca muere) (Neox), Hermanos y detectives (Telecinco), as well as in the last episode of Los hombres de Paco (Antena 3).

In Periodistas FC she worked as a presenter and reporter of the program together with the presenters Dani Mateo and Ricardo Castella. Since the cancellation of this program, she joined Sé lo que hicisteis..., also in La Sexta. In June of that same year she was on the cover of Primera Línea and in July, of the male magazine FHM.

From 2011 until 2013 she participated in the Antena 3 series Gran Hotel as Cristina Olmedo, being the sister of Julio Olmedo (Yon González). In 2012 she started a new series Imperium, the spin-off of Hispania, la leyenda with Lluís Homar, Nathalie Poza or Ángela Cremonte among others. In November of the same year, she was again on the cover of FHM magazine. In 2013 she gave life to Carolina Jiménez in Gran Reserva: El origen for TVE, prequel to the series Gran Reserva. From 2014 until 2015 she was in the series B&b, de boca en boca for the prime time of Telecinco in which she gave life to Martina.

In May 2015, it was announced her signing with La 1, to host the prime time program Cocineros al volante. In 2016 she signs for the second season of Víctor Ros as the female lead. She also participates in the fourth season of Velvet acting in three episodes. In 2017 she participates in the play La madre que me parió, renewed for a second tour premiered on August 23 of the same year. In July she signs for Zapeando, working on it until 2019, being one of the collaborators of the program..

In April 2018, her participation in the third edition of the MasterChef Celebrity contest was confirmed. The contest was premiered in September and Paula Prendes was the first eliminated. From 2019 to 2021, she presented, with Boris Izaguirre, Prodigios on TVE for three seasons. In October 2019 she joined with a fixed role in the daily series Servir y proteger  playing Lara Muñoz.

Filmography

Films

Television series

Theater

Television programs

References

External links 
 Paula Prendes on IMDb

Spanish television presenters
Spanish television actresses
Pontifical University of Salamanca alumni
Living people
1983 births
Women sports journalists
Women radio journalists